The True North Stakes is a Grade II American Thoroughbred horse race for horses aged four years old and older held over a distance of six and half furlongs on dirt  scheduled annually in early June at Belmont Park in Elmont, New York.  The event currently carries a purse of $300,000.

History

The True North is named for the winner of the 1945 Fall Highweight Handicap, W. Deering Howe's, True North.

The event was inaugurated on 9 July 1979 as the True North Handicap and was won by the longshot Moleolus in a time of 1:10.

The event was classified as Grade III in 1982 and upgraded to Grade II in 1985. The only mare to win the event was Gold Beauty in 1993.

In winning the 1987 edition of the True North Handicap, Groovy earned a Beyer Speed Figure of 134.

In 2014 the conditions of the race changed to a stakes race. In 2017 the distance of the race was changed from 6 furlongs to  furlongs.

Records

Speed record:
  furlongs – 1:14.85 – Catalina Cruiser (2019)
 6 furlongs – 1:07.80 – Groovy (1987)

Most wins:
 2 - Firenze Fire (2020, 2021)

Most wins by a trainer:
 3 – William I. Mott (1991, 1993, 1998)
 3 – Todd Pletcher (2004, 2010, 2015)

Margin:
  lengths –  Trappe Shot (2011)

Most wins by a jockey:
 3 – Jean-Luc Samyn (1979, 1981, 1999)
 3 – Ángel Cordero Jr. (1987, 1988, 1989)
 3 – Robbie Davis (1996, 1997, 2000)
 3 – Javier Castellano (2012, 2015, 2018)

Most wins by an owner:
 2 – Seymour Cohn (1985, 1999)
 2 – Mr. Amore Stables (2020, 2021)

Winners

Notes:

‡ Filly or Mare

§ Ran as part of an entry

See also
 List of American and Canadian Graded races

References

Grade 2 stakes races in the United States
Graded stakes races in the United States
Open sprint category horse races
Horse races in New York (state)
Recurring sporting events established in 1979
Belmont Park
1979 establishments in New York (state)